Pirangi is a municipality in the state of São Paulo in Brazil. The population is 11,471 (2020 est.) in an area of 216 km². The elevation is 538 m above sea level.

References

Municipalities in São Paulo (state)